Pseudopostega elachista is a moth of the family Opostegidae. It was described by Walsingham, Lord Thomas de Grey, in 1914. It is known from Guerrero, Mexico.

Adults have been recorded in September.

References

Opostegidae
Moths described in 1914